Matthew Steven Stites (born May 28, 1990) is an American former professional baseball pitcher. He pitched in Major League Baseball for the Arizona Diamondbacks in 2014 and 2015.

Career

Amateur
Stites attended Festus High School in Festus, Missouri. He then enrolled at Jefferson College, where he played for the college baseball team. He had a 9–2 win-loss record and a 1.69 earned run average (ERA) as a sophomore and was named a junior college All-American. In 2010, he played collegiate summer baseball with the Falmouth Commodores of the Cape Cod Baseball League. The Chicago Cubs selected Stites in the 33rd round, with the 1,000th overall selection, of the 2010 MLB draft. Stites opted not to sign, and instead transferred to the University of Missouri, where he played for the Missouri Tigers baseball team. He led the team with 92 innings pitched.

San Diego Padres
The San Diego Padres selected Stites in the 17th round, with the 533rd overall selection, of the 2011 MLB draft.

Arizona Diamondbacks
On July 31, 2013, the Padres traded Stites along with Joe Thatcher to the Arizona Diamondbacks for Ian Kennedy. He missed the remainder of the 2013 season following an emergency appendectomy.

On June 19, 2014, Stites was recalled to Arizona's roster, replacing Tony Campana. He had a 5.73 ERA in 33 innings. Stites began the 2015 season in the minors, and was promoted to the major leagues on June 30. He was released on July 3, 2017.

York Revolution
On March 22, 2018, Stites signed with the York Revolution of the Atlantic League of Professional Baseball. He announced his retirement on April 4, 2018.

Personal life
Stites grew up as a fan of the St. Louis Cardinals. His older brother, Cody, serves in the United States Air Force.

References

External links

1990 births
Living people
Arizona Diamondbacks players
Jefferson Vikings baseball players
Missouri Tigers baseball players
Falmouth Commodores players
Arizona League Padres players
Eugene Emeralds players
Fort Wayne Wizards players
Peoria Javelinas players
Salt River Rafters players
San Antonio Missions players
Mobile BayBears players
Reno Aces players
York Revolution players
Major League Baseball pitchers
Baseball players from Missouri
People from Festus, Missouri